Cuchilla Grande Inferior is a hill range in Uruguay that constitutes part of a larger range named Cuchilla Grande.

It is located in the south of the country in the Departments of Florida, Flores, Soriano and north of San José and Colonia.

References 

Hills of Uruguay